Waihou is a rural settlement in the Matamata-Piako District and Waikato region of New Zealand's North Island.

Waihou Recreational Reserve provides sporting facilities.

At the beginning of the 20th century, Waihou had a population of about 100, a railway siding and a primary school.

Demographics
Waihou is part of the larger Waihou-Manawaru statistical area.

Waihou had a population of 318 at the 2018 New Zealand census, an increase of 48 people (17.8%) since the 2013 census, and an increase of 57 people (21.8%) since the 2006 census. There were 120 households, comprising 165 males and 156 females, giving a sex ratio of 1.06 males per female, with 63 people (19.8%) aged under 15 years, 54 (17.0%) aged 15 to 29, 129 (40.6%) aged 30 to 64, and 75 (23.6%) aged 65 or older.

Ethnicities were 88.7% European/Pākehā, 13.2% Māori, 4.7% Pacific peoples, 1.9% Asian, and 3.8% other ethnicities. People may identify with more than one ethnicity.

Although some people chose not to answer the census's question about religious affiliation, 63.2% had no religion, 22.6% were Christian, and 0.9% were Hindu.

Of those at least 15 years old, 21 (8.2%) people had a bachelor's or higher degree, and 81 (31.8%) people had no formal qualifications. 36 people (14.1%) earned over $70,000 compared to 17.2% nationally. The employment status of those at least 15 was that 117 (45.9%) people were employed full-time, 39 (15.3%) were part-time, and 6 (2.4%) were unemployed.

Education
Waihou School opened in 1880. At the beginning of the 20th century it has 110 students on the roll. It closed in 2000.

Elstow-Waihou Combined School, called Elstow School before 2000, is a full primary school catering for years 1–8.

References

Matamata-Piako District
Populated places in Waikato